Grantsville is the second most populous city in Tooele County, Utah, United States. It is part of the Salt Lake City, Utah Metropolitan Statistical Area.  The population was 12,617 at the 2020 census. The city has grown slowly and steadily throughout most of its existence, but rapid increases in growth occurred during the 1970s, 1990s, and 2010s.  Recent rapid growth has been attributed to being close to Salt Lake City, small town community feel, lower housing costs than Salt Lake County, the nearby Deseret Peak recreational center, the Utah Motorsports Campus raceway, and the newly built Wal-Mart distribution center located just outside the city.  It is quickly becoming a bedroom community for commuters into the Salt Lake Valley.

History
The area of Grantsville was originally populated by the Goshute tribe.

Grantsville was originally called "Willow Creek", and has also been called "Twenty Wells" due to the natural wells that give fresh water to the area. Grantsville was settled by Mormon pioneers in 1850, with the arrival of the brothers-in-law James McBride and Harrison Severe, with their wives and families. The present name, after Col. George D. Grant, a leader in the Church of Jesus Christ of Latter-day Saints, was adopted c. 1853. A post office called Grantsville has been in operation since 1864. The Anderson–Clark Farmstead has outbuildings dating back from 1880, and was first owned by the pioneer James McBride.

Geography
Grantsville is bordered on the south by South Mountain, which separates Rush Valley from Tooele Valley. To the north is Stansbury Island, and on the east are the Oquirrh Mountains and the Great Salt Lake, and on the west side the Stansbury Mountains. SR-138 passes through the city, heading northwest to intersect with I-80 and east to Stansbury Park.

The climate is hot during the summer and cold and snowy during the winter. Although Grantsville can be affected by lake-effect snow from the Great Salt Lake, most of the time, it is too far southwest.

Demographics

As of the 2020 census, there were 12,617 people, and 3,855 households in the city. The population density was 335.65 people per square mile (129.59/km2). The racial makeup of the city was 91.2% White, 0.2% African American, 0.6% Native American, 0.3% Asian, 0.2% Pacific Islander, 2.1% some other race, and 5.5% from two or more races. Hispanic or Latino of any race were 7.3% of the population.

Recorded in the 2020 census: There were 3,855 household units, out of which 68.8% were married couples living together, 9.0% had a male householder with no spouse present, and 14.4% had a female householder with no spouse. 7.8% of all households were made up of individuals. The average family size was 3.69. The median age was 27.9 years. 8.1% of the population was 65 years and older. 6.8% of the population was veterans.

The median income for a household in the city was $84,293. 5.0% of the population were below the poverty line.

24.9% of the population has a Bachelor's Degree or higher. The School Enrolled Population Enrolled in Kindergarten to 12th Grade is 79.0%.

Employment: 72.8% of employees are private company workers, 16.8% government workers, 5.9% private not-for-profit workers, 3.4% self-employed in not owned business, and 1.1% self-employed in own business.

Education
Grantsville is in the Tooele County School District and has three elementary schools (Grantsville, Twenty Wells, and Willow), Grantsville Junior High School, and Grantsville High School. There are also a few preschools.

Due to a fire on July 13, 2009, Grantsville Elementary School was forced to close until a new elementary school was built. The new school opened for the 2011–2012 school year.

Events 

The Old Folks Sociable is the traditional social event of the year. The Old Folks Sociable idea started in 1875 when professional photographer Charles Savage and LDS Church Presiding Bishop Edward Hunter inaugurated "Old Folks Day" to honor fathers and mothers. The first Old Folks Sociable held in Grantsville was on January 6, 1884. This annual event is believed to have been canceled only twice in its 125-year history.

The Old Folks Sociable honors all residents and former residents who are 75 years older. Grantsville High School, home to the Old Folks Sociable, becomes a gathering place for high school class reunions and family reunions. The Sociable is also a celebration of Grantsville's heritage. For residents and former residents, it is a walk down memory lane. Events include a 5K run, a car show, a program, a reception for honored guests, a dinner, and a dance. All residents and former (eighteen years and older) are invited to attend.  The Old Folks Sociable is held each year during the month of March.

Notable people 
 Parley P. Christensen, American attorney and politician who was a Utah state representative, a Los Angeles City Council member, and the Farmer–Labor Party's presidential nominee during the 1920 presidential election
 Joshua Reuben Clark Jr., former U.S. ambassador to Mexico
 William Jefferies Jr., English Mormon pioneer and early settler of the American frontier
 Jack Johnson (tackle), professional American football player
 Merrill Nelson, American politician
 Lula Greene Richards, a poet and the first female periodical editor in Utah Territory
 Marianne C. Sharp, first counselor in the general presidency of the Relief Society of the Church of Jesus Christ of Latter-day Saints from 1945-1974
 Colin Haynie, mass murderer

References

External links

 Grantsville City Website

Populated places established in 1848
Cities in Utah
Cities in Tooele County, Utah
Salt Lake City metropolitan area
1848 establishments in the United States